Scar Hanan is a 1925 American silent Western film directed by Edward Linden and Ben F. Wilson and starring Yakima Canutt, Dorothy Wood and Helen Broneau.

Cast
 Yakima Canutt as Scar Hanan
 Dorothy Wood as Marian Fleming
 Helen Broneau as Julia Creighton
 Palmer Morrison as Dr. Crig Fleming
 Dick Hatton as Shorty 
 George Lessey as Bart Hutchins
 Francis Ford as Jury foreman
 Art Walker as Sheriff
 Frank Baker as Edward Fitzhugh Carstowe
 Ben Wilson Jr. as Young Scar Hanan

References

Bibliography
 Connelly, Robert B. The Silents: Silent Feature Films, 1910-36, Volume 40, Issue 2. December Press, 1998.
 Munden, Kenneth White. The American Film Institute Catalog of Motion Pictures Produced in the United States, Part 1. University of California Press, 1997.

External links
 

1925 films
1925 Western (genre) films
1920s English-language films
American silent feature films
Silent American Western (genre) films
American black-and-white films
Films directed by Ben F. Wilson
Film Booking Offices of America films
1920s American films